Henry Lehman (born Hayum Lehmann; September 29, 1822 – November 17, 1855) was a German-born American businessman and the founder of Lehman Brothers, which grew from a cotton and fabrics shop during his life to become a large finance firm under his brothers' descendents.

Life and work
Lehman was born under the name of Hayum Lehmann to a Jewish family, the son of Eva (Rosenheim) and Abraham Lehmann, a cattle merchant in the small Franconian town of Rimpar near Würzburg. Lehman emigrated to the United States in 1844, where he changed his name to Henry Lehman. He settled in Montgomery, Alabama, and opened a dry goods store named, "H. Lehman". In 1847, following the arrival of his younger brother Emanuel Lehman, the firm became, "H. Lehman and Bro."  With the 1850 arrival of Mayer Lehman, the youngest brother, the firm became "Lehman Brothers".

In those years, cotton was the most important crop of the Southern United States. Capitalizing on cotton's extremely high market value around the world, the Lehman brothers became cotton factors, accepting cotton bales from customers as payment for their merchandise. They eventually began a second business as traders in cotton. Within a few years, this became the major part of their firm.

In 1855, Henry Lehman died from yellow fever while travelling in New Orleans.  Later, his brothers moved the company's headquarters to New York City, eventually building it into an important American investment bank, which was in operation for over 150 years until its September 15, 2008, collapse.

References

1822 births
1855 deaths
American bankers
Businesspeople from Alabama
Businesspeople from New Orleans
Deaths from yellow fever
German emigrants to the United States
19th-century German Jews
Lehman Brothers people
People from Würzburg (district)
People from Montgomery, Alabama
Lehman family
Burials at Woodlawn Cemetery (Bronx, New York)
19th-century American Jews
Infectious disease deaths in Louisiana